Lake Mâţelor is a natural salt lake in the town of Ocna Sibiului, Sibiu County, Transylvania, Romania. It is one of the many lakes of the Ocna Sibiului mine, a large salt mine which has one of the largest salt reserves in Romania.

Name 
Lacul Mâţelor means lake of the small cats or lake of the kittens.

History 
The salt mine on which it is located is not documented, but it was exploited in the late middle-ages with a bell-system, at a depth of more than 80 m through two wells.

Information 
Surface: 
Maximum Depth:  (2nd of the mine's lakes, behind Lake Avram Iancu-Ocniţa)
Salinity: 34 g/L at the surface, up to 323 g/L at 8.5 m depth.

Lakes of the salt mine 
 Auster 
 Lake Avram Iancu-Ocniţa
 Balta cu Nămol 
 Brâncoveanu 
 Cloşca 
 Crişan
 Lacul Fără Fund 
 Gura Minei 
 Horea 
 Mâţelor 
 Negru
 Pânzelor 
 Rândunica 
 Verde (Freshwater lake)
 Vrăjitoarelor (Freshwater lake)

Sources

References

Lakes of Sibiu County